The Koon House No. 2 is a historic house at 2959 U.S. Highway 167 in Sheridan, Arkansas.  It is a single story structure, built out of vertically placed small logs, split in half and set smooth side in and round side out.  It is roughly T-shaped, with a frame addition and a carport added later in the 20th century.  The house was built in 1936 by Hillary Henry "Pappy" Koon, and is one of several houses built in this distinctive manner in the area by Koon.  It is the first of the type he built, and was used as his family residence.

The house was listed on the National Register of Historic Places in 1999.

See also
National Register of Historic Places listings in Grant County, Arkansas

References

Houses on the National Register of Historic Places in Arkansas
Houses completed in 1936
Buildings and structures in Grant County, Arkansas
National Register of Historic Places in Grant County, Arkansas